Esculeoside A is a spirosolane-type glycoside with the molecular formula C58H95NO29.   The structure of this product is 3-Ο-β-lycotetraosyl (22S,23S,25S)-23-acetoxy-3β,27-dihydroxy-5α-spirosolane 27-Ο-β-D-glucopyranoside. Fujiwara and colleagues were the first to isolate esculeoside A from the ripe fruit of the Cherry tomato in 2002. Esculeoside A, along with many other steroidal alkaloid glycosides, have been shown to possess cytotoxic activity that could result in a variety of potential health benefits for humans.

Synthesis 
This natural product can be obtained using column chromatographies of high-porous polystyrene gels and reversed silica gels from a methanolic extract of many varieties of tomatoes. It will appear as colorless needles when synthesized using this method.

Evidence suggests that α-tomatine is a precursor of esculeoside A. In order for alpha tomatine to be converted to esculeoside A, isomerization of the F-ring is required.  The mechanism for this reaction is unclear at this time but research from Iijima and colleagues in 2009 suggest a glycosylation step in the putative pathway from α-tomatine to esculeoside A depends on the plant hormone ethylene.

Occurrence 
Potatoes, eggplant, and tomatoes are all solanaceous plants that contain unique glycoalkaloids. In the case of tomatoes, one of those unique glycoalkaloids is esculeoside A.  
A tomato saponin, esculeoside A, is found in quantities four times that of lycopene in ripe tomatoes.

Potential health benefits 
Studies have shown esculeoside A may be metabolized into derivatives that perform various beneficial activities in the human body including anti-osteoporosis, anti-menopausal disorder and anti-tumor activities. 
Recent studies in mice have shown a potential link between esculeoside A and cholesterol levels.  In one study, esculeoside A administered to mice reduced serum levels of LDL cholesterol and triglycerides by 25-45% without impacting the rates of HDL cholesterol. The potential health benefits of esculeoside A appear to change with factors such as the age of the tomato fruit, the heat used in processing tomatoes, and the pH used in processing. 
The highest amounts of esculeoside A were found in the outer skin and wall (pericarp wall) of the tomato fruit.  Mature tomatoes tended to show higher amounts of esculeoside A than extracts taken from immature tomatoes.  Extracts of esculeoside A in the Katsumata study were shown to be stable when heated until the point of 225 °C.  This same study found esculeoside A extracts in water at pH 7-11 were stable throughout the heat sterilization process but unstable under acidic conditions.  
Research has also shown esculeoside A amounts increase when tomatoes are treated with the phytohormone, ethylene.
Collectively, research suggests daily intake of esculeoside A from tomatoes could have many benefits.

References

External links

Steroidal glycosides
Alkaloid glycosides
Saponins